Rainn Percival Dietrich Wilson (born January 20, 1966) is an American actor, comedian, podcaster, producer, writer, and director. He is best known for his role as Dwight Schrute on the NBC sitcom The Office, for which he earned three consecutive Emmy Award nominations for Outstanding Supporting Actor in a Comedy Series.

Born in Seattle, Wilson began acting at the University of Washington, and later worked in theatre in New York City after graduating in 1986. Wilson made his film debut in Galaxy Quest (1999), followed by supporting parts in Almost Famous (2000), Steven Soderbergh's Full Frontal (2002), and House of 1000 Corpses (2003). He also had a recurring part as Arthur Martin in the HBO series Six Feet Under from 2003 to 2005. From 2018 to 2021, he starred as Trevor on the CBS sitcom Mom.

Wilson was cast as Dwight Schrute in The Office in 2005, a role which he played until the show's conclusion in 2013. Other film credits include lead roles in the comedies The Rocker (2008) and Super (2010), as well as supporting roles in the horror films Cooties (2014) and The Boy (2015). In 2009, he provided his voice for the computer-animated science fiction film Monsters vs. Aliens as the villain Gallaxhar and voiced Gargamel in Smurfs: The Lost Village. He has played a small recurring role of Harry Mudd on Star Trek: Discovery (2017) and Star Trek: Short Treks (2018), as well as a supporting role in The Meg (2018). He is also the voice of Lex Luthor in the DC Animated Movie Universe.

Outside of acting, Wilson published an autobiography, The Bassoon King, in 2015, and co-founded the digital media company SoulPancake in 2008. In 2022, Wilson changed his name on his social media accounts in an effort to raise awareness for climate change.

Early life and education 
Wilson was born on January 20, 1966, at the University of Washington Medical Center in Seattle, Washington, the son of Shay Cooper, a yoga teacher and actress, and Robert G. Wilson (1941–2020), a novelist, artist, and business consultant who wrote the science fiction novel Tentacles of Dawn. Wilson is of part Norwegian ancestry. From the ages of three to five, Wilson lived with his father and stepmother, Kristin, in Nicaragua before they returned to Seattle after their divorce. He attended Kellogg Middle School and Shorecrest High School in Shoreline, Washington, where he played the clarinet and bassoon in the school band. He transferred to and graduated from New Trier High School after his family moved to Wilmette, Illinois, to serve at the Baháʼí National Center.

Wilson attended Tufts University in Medford, Massachusetts, before transferring to the University of Washington in Seattle, graduating with a bachelor's degree in drama in 1986. He then enrolled in New York University's Graduate Acting Program at the Tisch School of the Arts where he graduated with an MFA in acting and was a member of The Acting Company. While acting in theatrical productions in New York City, he drove a moving van to make ends meet.

Wilson worked extensively in the theater in his early career, performing with The Public Theater, the Ensemble Studio Theatre, Playwrights Horizons, the Roundabout, and the Guthrie Theater, among others. Wilson played one of the eight chorus members in Richard Foreman's 1996 production of Suzan-Lori Parks' Venus. He was nominated for three Helen Hayes Awards for Best Supporting Actor for his work at the Arena Stage.

Career

1997–2004: Early roles 
Wilson first appeared onscreen in 1997 in an episode of the soap opera One Life to Live, followed by a supporting role in the television film The Expendables (1999). Wilson made his feature film debut in Galaxy Quest (1999), followed by a minor supporting role in Cameron Crowe's Almost Famous (2000). In 2001, he played  Dennis Van De Meer in When Billie Beat Bobby. In 2002, he was cast in a lead role in Rob Zombie's horror film House of 1000 Corpses (2003). Beginning in 2003, Wilson played Arthur Martin, an intern at Fisher & Diaz Funeral Home in HBO's Six Feet Under, earning a Screen Actors Guild award for best drama ensemble for the series. He also had minor roles in America's Sweethearts (2001) and the Melvin van Peebles biopic Baadasssss! (2003). Wilson guest-starred in Law & Order: Special Victims Unit, CSI: Crime Scene Investigation, Entourage, Monk, Numbers, Charmed, Tim and Eric Awesome Show, Great Job, and Reno 911!.

2005–2013: The Office and recognition 
In 2005, Wilson appeared in the comedy film Sahara and in the independent mockumentary film The Life Coach.

The same year, Wilson was cast as Dwight Schrute, a neurotic office worker in the network series The Office. He was nominated for an Emmy for Best Supporting Actor in 2007, 2008, and 2009. He won two SAG awards for best comedy ensemble on the series. In addition to acting on the series, Wilson also directed three episodes: season 6's "The Cover-Up", season 7's "Classy Christmas", and season 8's "Get the Girl".

On February 24, 2007, Wilson hosted Saturday Night Live, becoming the second cast member from The Office to host (after Steve Carell). During the 2007 FIFA Women's World Cup, Wilson appeared in ads for the 2007 United States women's national soccer team as public relations manager "Jim Mike". In August 2010, Wilson appeared in the music video for Ferraby Lionheart's "Harry and Bess" and Andy Grammer's "Keep Your Head Up" as the "creepy elevator guy".

Wilson starred in the Fox Atomic comedy The Rocker, released on August 20, 2008. In 2009 he lent his voice to DreamWorks Animation film Monsters vs. Aliens, as the villainous alien overlord Gallaxhar, and was featured in Transformers: Revenge of the Fallen, in which he played a university professor. In 2010, he played the lead role as the unhinged protagonist in Super. In his review of the film, critic Roger Ebert praised Wilson's performance, writing: "[Wilson] never seems to be trying to be funny, and that's a strength," though he faulted the script's material.

For his role of Paul, the bereft father, in Hesher (2011), Roger Ebert said of Rainn in his review: “He has that rare quality in an actor, an uncanny presence. There are a few like him (Jack Nicholson, Christopher Walken, Bill Murray) who need only to look at something to establish an attitude toward it. Yes, they can get worked up, they can operate on high, but their passive essence is the point: dubious, wise, sadly knowledgable[sic], at an angle to the throughline. Other actors could sit on a sofa and watch TV, but Rainn Wilson makes it a statement. A statement of … nothing, which is the point."

2014–present: continued film and television 
In 2014, Wilson had roles in the independent horror comedy Cooties and the thriller The Boy (2015). In the Fox crime-drama Backstrom, Wilson played Everett Backstrom, an offensive, self-destructive detective who is part of a team of eccentric criminologists. The series is based on Leif G. W. Persson's Swedish book series of the same name. Wilson also served as the show's producer. It was cancelled by Fox after 13 episodes. In 2016, he appeared in television as a guest star on Roadies.

In 2017, Wilson voiced the character of Gargamel in the 2017 animated reboot of The Smurfs: The Lost Village for Sony Pictures Animation. He also starred in the independent comedy film Permanent as loving and funny father Jim Dickson alongside Patricia Arquette and Kira McLean. The film was directed by Colette Burson and produced by 2929 Entertainment. Wilson starred in Shimmer Lake (2017) for Netflix and The Meg (2018) for Warner Brothers.

Wilson was cast to play Harry Mudd in Star Trek: Discovery and directed the Star Trek: Short Treks The Escape Artist. Wilson has voiced Lex Luthor in the most recent animated Superman movies from DC, including The Death of Superman, Reign of the Supermen, and Batman: Hush.

In 2019, Wilson appeared in the independent drama Blackbird opposite Susan Sarandon and Kate Winslet, and in 2020 starred in the independent thriller Don't Tell a Soul, opposite Jack Dylan Grazer and Fionn Whitehead. Also that year, he was a series regular opposite John Cusack and Sasha Lane in the new Amazon Original Series Utopia, as virologist Dr. Michael Sterns. On October 10, 2019 he was featured in a 30 minute YouTube documentary created by SoulPancake in collaboration with Funny or Die wherein a variety of comedians discuss mental health called Laughing Matters. He was cast as the villain in the upcoming animated film Hitpig. In 2020, Wilson was an executive producer and narrator for the Netflix documentary series We Are the Champions.

Other ventures 
Wilson founded the website and YouTube channel SoulPancake. As of February 20, 2019, the channel has over 3 million subscribers and over 557 million video views. SoulPancake has been featured on Oprah Winfrey's Satellite Radio Show and Super Soul Sunday. The tagline of the brand is: "We make stuff that matters". They were named one of Fast Company's 10 Most Innovative Companies in Video for 2015.[1] More recently, SoulPancake was ranked No. 114 on the 2015 Inc. 500 Fastest-Growing Private Companies in America List. In October 2016, it was purchased by Participant Media.

He co-wrote the New York Times bestseller SoulPancake: Chew on Life's Big Questions and wrote a humorous memoir about his personal life, career and faith called The Bassoon King that was published in November 2015.

Wilson is a climate change activist and visited Greenland in 2019 with Arctic Basecamp whose Advisory Board he also serves on. During his Greenland trip Wilson made a documentary “The Idiot’s Guide to Climate Change” which is available to stream online.

In 2021, Wilson starred in the comedy audio series Dark Air with Terry Carnation, in which he also voices the title character. The podcast series is based on his character Terry Carnation from the Radio Rental podcast, created by Payne Lindsey. Wilson also competed in the Chess.com PogChamps 3 chess competition, finishing in second place after a tiebreaker game with French streamer Sardoche.

Personal life 
Wilson is married to writer Holiday Reinhorn. The couple met in an acting class at the University of Washington; Reinhorn had relocated to Seattle to attend the university from her native Portland, Oregon. The couple married on the Kalama River in Washington in 1995 and have a son, Walter, born in 2004. They have a home outside of Sisters, Oregon, and a house in Los Angeles. They have two pit bulls, Pilot and Diamond; two Vietnamese pot-bellied pigs, Snortington and Amy; a donkey named Chili Beans; and a zonkey named Derek.

Wilson and his family are members of the Baháʼí Faith. The website Baháʼí Blog, which is popular in the Bahá’í community, hosts Wilson's podcast, the Baháʼí Blogcast, on which he interviews notable people about the intersection of their faith and their work.

On Bill Maher's Real Time, Wilson described himself as a diverse independent, having voted for Republican, Green, and Democratic candidates.

Wilson's charitable works include fundraising for the Mona Foundation, a Bahá’í-inspired charity operating in developing countries. In 2013, along with Dr. Kathryn Adams, he co-founded Lidè Haiti, an educational initiative that uses the arts and literacy to empower adolescent girls in rural Haiti. They currently work in 13 locations with over 500 girls, providing scholarships to many of them. In 2018, Wilson stated he had adopted a vegan lifestyle.

On November 10, 2022, Wilson changed his name on social media to Rainnfall Heat Wave Rising Sea Levels Wilson in an effort to raise awareness about climate change, though he did not legally change his name.

Filmography

Film

Television

Video games

Written publications 
 Rainn Wilson. Soul Pancake. 2010. Hatchette Books, 
 Rainn Wilson. The Bassoon King. 2016. Dutton,

References

External links 

 SoulPancake.com
 
 
 
 Rainn Wilson at the American Film Institute catalog
 
 

1966 births
Living people
20th-century American male actors
20th-century Bahá'ís
21st-century American male actors
21st-century Bahá'ís
American Bahá'ís
American bloggers
American male bloggers
American male film actors
American male television actors
American male voice actors
American people of English descent
American people of Norwegian descent
Male actors from Seattle
People from Shoreline, Washington
People from Sisters, Oregon
Tisch School of the Arts alumni
University of Washington alumni
Tufts University School of Arts and Sciences alumni